East Smithfield is an unincorporated community in Bradford County, Pennsylvania, United States. East Smithfield has a post office with ZIP code 18817.

References

Unincorporated communities in Bradford County, Pennsylvania
Unincorporated communities in Pennsylvania